Hamont-Achel dialect or Hamont-Achel Limburgish is the city dialect and variant of Limburgish spoken in the Belgian city of Hamont-Achel alongside the Dutch language (with which it is not mutually intelligible).

Native speakers of the dialect tend to call it either Haëmets or Achels, depending on where they are from (the former city of Hamont or the former village of Achel).

Phonology
The following section describes the dialect as it is spoken in Hamont.

Consonants

 are bilabial, whereas  are labiodental.
 do not occur as frequently as in many other dialects, and can be said to be marginal phonemes.
 is a uvular trill. Word-finally it is devoiced to either a fricative  or a fricative trill .
Other allophones include . They appear in contexts similar to Belgian Standard Dutch.
Voiceless consonants are regressively assimilated. An example of this is the past tense of regular verbs, where voiceless stops and fricatives are voiced before the past tense morpheme .
Word-final voiceless consonants are voiced in intervocalic position.

Vowels
The Hamont-Achel dialect contains 22 monophthong and 13 diphthong phonemes. The amount of monophthongs is higher than that of consonants.

Monophthongs

On average, long vowels are 95 ms longer than short vowels. This is very similar to Belgian Standard Dutch, in which the difference is 105 ms.

The quality of the monophthongs is as follows:
  are similar to the corresponding cardinal vowels , but none of them are quite as peripheral.
The phonetic distance between it and the close-mid  is not very great; the same has been reported in the Ripuarian dialect of Kerkrade spoken on the Germany–Netherlands border. At the same time,  is phonetically similar to the unstressable  and the two differ mainly in rounding.

Monophthong-glide combinations
Unlike in the neighboring dialect of Weert, all monophthong-glide combinations are restricted to the syllable coda.

Diphthongs
Dialect of Hamont-Achel contrasts long and short closing diphthongs. The long ones are on average 70 ms longer than their short equivalents. Centering diphthongs are all long.

 The target of the centering diphthongs is a rather close schwa .

Prosody

Like most other Limburgish dialects, but unlike some other dialects in this area, the prosody of the Hamont-Achel dialect has a lexical tone distinction, which is traditionally referred to as stoottoon ('push tone') or Accent 1, which generally has a shortening effect on the syllable and sleeptoon ('dragging tone') or Accent 2. As in other articles, the latter is transcribed as a high tone, whereas the former is not marked. The difference between Accent 1 and Accent 2 can signal either lexical differences or grammatical distinctions, such as those between the singular and the plural forms of some nouns. It is phonemic only in stressed syllables, an example of a minimal pair is   '(record) sleeve' vs.   'house'.

References

Bibliography

 
 
 
 
 
 

Hamont-Achel
Languages of Belgium
Limburg (Belgium)
Low Franconian languages
West Limburgish dialects
City colloquials